The 2023 European Athletics U23 Championships will be the 14th edition of the biennial athletics competition between European athletes under the age of twenty-three. The 2023 European Athletics U23 Championships are organized by World Athletics and European Athletics Association and scheduled to be held from 13–16 July 2023 in Espoo, Finland.

Results

Men

Track 

* Indicates the athletes only competed in the preliminary heats and received medals.

Field

Combined

Women

Track 

* Indicates the athletes only competed in the preliminary heats and received medals.

Field

Combined

Entry standards

References

External links
 Athletics - European U-23 Championships - 2023 - Detailed results The Sports

2023 
2023 U23
Under-23 athletics competitions
Continental athletics championships
Biennial athletics competitions
European U23 Championships
Scheduled sports events
International athletics competitions hosted by Finland
2023 in Finnish sport
July 2023 sports events in Europe
Athletics in Finland
2020s in Finland